The 910s BC is a decade which lasted from 919 BC to 910 BC.

Events and trends
 915 BC (by William F. Albright) – Death of Rehoboam, King of the ancient Kingdom of Judah.
 911 BC – Adad-nirari II succeeds his father Ashur-Dan II as king of Assyria.
 911 BC – Abijah, king of Judah, dies.
 910 BC – Nadab, king of Israel succeeds his father Jeroboam I after he reigns of 22 years and dies.

Significant people
 Ashurnasirpal II, king of Assyria, is born (approximate date).
 Omri, king of Israel, is born (approximate date).

References

 

es:Años 910 a. C.